DESMOND (Diabetes Education and Self Management for Ongoing and Newly Diagnosed) is a UK NHS training course for people with type 2 diabetes that helps people to identify their own health risks and to set their own goals.

Background 
DESMOND is the first national education programme created for people with Type 2 diabetes. DESMOND meets the criteria NICE identified as being the characteristics of a quality, evidence-based structured education programme.

A NHS training course is available for type 1 diabetics called DAFNE (Dose Adjustment for Normal Eating).

Course details

Format 
Each programme is run in a group setting, consisting of not more than 10 people newly diagnosed with Type 2 diabetes (normally within the last 12 months), accompanied, if they so choose, by a partner, family member, or friend. The programme may be run as a one-day, or two part (2 x half-day) course.

The DESMOND programme is facilitated by two health care professionals who have been formally trained.

Content 
Topics covered in the DESMOND curriculum:
The patient story
What diabetes is
Main ways to manage diabetes
Consequences of diabetes and personal risk from having diabetes
Monitoring your diabetes
Ways to take action to improve the control of your diabetes
Food choices for diabetics
Physical activity and diabetes
Stress and emotions and diabetes
The purpose and content of annual diabetic review and screening in diabetics

See also
Diabetes mellitus type 2

References

NHS DESMOND homepage
NHS NICE criteria for diabetes training courses

External links 
DESMOND NHS project website
Diabetes UK charity website

Diabetes